The Philippines competed at the 2004 Summer Olympics in Athens, from 13 to 29 August 2004. This was the nation's eighteenth appearance at the Olympics, except the 1980 Summer Olympics in Moscow because of its partial support to the United States boycott.

The Philippine Olympic Committee (POC) sent a total of 16 athletes, 12 men and 4 women, competing in 6 sports. Five Filipino athletes had previously competed in Sydney, including taekwondo jin and SEA Games champion Donald Geisler and boxing veteran Romeo Brin, who became the nation's flag bearer in the opening ceremony. Brin's teammate and boxer Christopher Camat was originally selected by the committee to carry the flag, but surpassed his lifetime privilege to the veteran, as he decided to witness his action and prepare for the next day's opening bout.

Philippines left Athens without a single Olympic medal for the second consecutive time. Among all the athletes, welterweight taekwondo jin Mary Antoinette Rivero only progressed further into the semifinals, where she lost the match to host nation's Elisavet Mystakidou and the second repechage bout to South Korea's Hwang Kyung-Seon, leaving the Filipino squad without a single Olympic medal for the second straight time.

Archery

One Filipino archer qualified for the women's individual archery.

Athletics

Filipino athletes have so far achieved qualifying standards in the following athletics events (up to a maximum of 3 athletes in each event at the 'A' Standard, and 1 at the 'B' Standard).

Men
Track & road events

Women
Field events

Key
Note–Ranks given for track events are within the athlete's heat only
Q = Qualified for the next round
q = Qualified for the next round as a fastest loser or, in field events, by position without achieving the qualifying target
NR = National record
N/A = Round not applicable for the event
Bye = Athlete not required to compete in round

Boxing

Filipino boxers qualified for the following events:

Shooting

Men

Swimming

Filipino swimmers have achieved qualifying standards in the following events (up to a maximum of 2 swimmers in each event at the A-standard, and 1 at the B-standard):

Men

Women

Taekwondo

Three Filipino taekwondo jin qualified for the following events:

See also
 Philippines at the 2002 Asian Games
 Philippines at the 2004 Summer Paralympics

References

External links
Official Report of the XXVIII Olympiad
Philippine Olympic Committee

Nations at the 2004 Summer Olympics
2004 Summer Olympics
Summer Olympics